Pelophylax fukienensis is a species of frog in the family Ranidae. It is found in Fujian (formerly romanized as "Fukien", hence the name), Zhejiang, and Jiangxi provinces of China as well as in Taiwan.

Its natural habitats are subtropical or tropical moist lowland forests, subtropical or tropical moist montane forests, swamps, freshwater marshes, rural gardens, heavily degraded former forest, water storage areas, ponds, irrigated land, seasonally flooded agricultural land, and canals and ditches. It is not considered threatened by the IUCN, though the Taiwanese populations have strongly declined.

Pelophylax fukienensis is a medium to large-sized frog, with males reaching  and females  length.

References

Pelophylax
Amphibians of China
Amphibians of Taiwan
Amphibians described in 1929
Taxa named by Clifford H. Pope
Taxonomy articles created by Polbot